The Primetime Emmy Award for Outstanding Scripted Variety Series is an award presented to the best sketch comedy-driven variety show of the year. The award goes to the producers of the series.

History
In 2015, Outstanding Variety Series was separated into two categories – Outstanding Variety Talk Series and Outstanding Variety Sketch Series.

In 2023, the category will be renamed Outstanding Scripted Variety Series.

Winners and nominations

2010s
Outstanding Variety Sketch Series

2020s

Outstanding Scripted Variety Series

Programs with multiple wins
Totals include wins for Outstanding Variety Series.

8 wins
 Saturday Night Live (6 consecutive)

Programs with multiple nominations
Totals include nominations for Outstanding Variety Series.

27 nominations
 Saturday Night Live

6 nominations
 Drunk History

4 nominations
 Portlandia

3 nominations
 A Black Lady Sketch Show
 Documentary Now!

2 nominations
 At Home with Amy Sedaris
 I Love You, America with Sarah Silverman
 Inside Amy Schumer
 Key & Peele
 Tracey Ullman's Show

Total awards by network

 NBC – 6
 Comedy Central – 2

References

Scripted Variety Series
Awards established in 2015
Awards disestablished in 2020